Marc Brendan Parlange (born 1962) is an American academic, recognised for his research expertise in environmental fluid mechanics and research in hydrology and climate change. His contributions primarily relate to the measurement and simulation of air movement over complex terrain, with a focus on how atmospheric turbulence dynamics influence urban, agricultural and alpine environments and wind energy. He has also been active in addressing water resources challenges and environmental change in remote communities, particularly West Africa.

Parlange has occupied senior academic roles at the University of California Davis, Johns Hopkins University, Ecole Polytechnique Fédérale de Lausanne and University of British Columbia. From 2017-2021 he was Provost and Senior Vice-President of Monash University, where he led the Melbourne Experiment research initiative analysing the impact of the Victorian Government's COVID-19 response on the urban environment.

In August 2021 Parlange became the twelfth President of the University of Rhode Island, succeeding David M. Dooley.

Career 

2021:     President, University of Rhode Island

2017-2021:     Provost and Senior Vice-President, Monash University

2013-2017:     Dean, Faculty of Applied Science (Engineering, Architecture, Planning, Nursing), University of British Columbia

2008-2013:     Dean, School of Architecture, Civil and Environmental Engineering, EPFL

2004-2008:     Professor, School of Architecture, Civil and Environmental, Ecole Polytechnique Fédérale de Lausanne (EPFL), Switzerland

1996-2004:     Professor, Department of Geography and Environmental Engineering, School of Engineering, Johns Hopkins University

1990-1996:     Assistant and Associate Professor, Department of Land, Air and Water Resources, and Department of Biological and Agricultural Engineering, University of California Davis

The Melbourne Experiment 
In March 2020, the Victorian Government announced a shutdown of non-essential venues and services to help contain the spread of the COVID-19 virus. With the implementation of the restrictions, Parlange established the Melbourne Experiment to bring together research expertise across Monash University to monitor and analyse elements of the urban environment before, during and after the COVID-19 shutdown. Featuring more than 40 unique interdisciplinary projects, the Melbourne Experiment focused on new approaches for urban renewal in alignment with the United Nations 2030 Sustainable Development Goals to advance the capital’s recovery.

Awards, honors and societies 
2020:     Hydrologic Sciences Medal, American Meteorological Society (Centennial)

2020:     Fellow, American Meteorological Society

2017:     Member, U.S. National Academy of Engineering

2017:     Fellow, Canadian Academy of Engineering

2017:     Distinguished Visiting Fellow, Cecil Green College, University of British Columbia

2017:     UBC Teaching Award. ‘Just desserts’, Student Society (Alma Mater Society)

2015:     Fellow, American Association for the Advancement of Science

2015:     Professional Engineer, Engineers and Geoscientists of British Columbia

2010:     University Teaching Award EPFL, La Polysphere - Agepoly, Faculty ENAC

2009:     Hydrologic Sciences Award, American Geophysical Union

2006:     Dalton Medal, European Geosciences Union

2004:     NCAR Outstanding Publication Award (Joint with NCAR & JHU colleagues)

1997:     Macelwane Medal, American Geophysical Union

1997:     Fellow, American Geophysical Union

1994:     Japan Visiting Lecturer Award in Hydrology and Hydraulics (Organizer, Civil Engineering Research Institute, Sapporo)

Journal Editorships 
2004-2009:     Editor in Chief, Water Resources Research

1997-2002:     Co-Editor Advances in Water Resources

Bibliography 
Bibliography available at Google Scholar.

References 

University of California, Davis faculty
Presidents of the University of Rhode Island
1962 births
Living people
Cornell University alumni
University of Rhode Island faculty
Academic staff of Monash University
Academic journal editors
Academic staff of the École Polytechnique Fédérale de Lausanne